NJPAC/Center Street station is a light rail station on the Newark Light Rail's Broad Street Extension. It is located in Downtown Newark, New Jersey, on the south west corner of the McCarter Highway and Center Street at the New Jersey Performing Arts Center (NJPAC) at the northern end of Military Park. The station is above ground, as is the rest of the line to the north.  To the south, after crossing Center Street, the train enters a tunnel to the underground station at Newark Penn Station. NJPAC/Center Street is the southernmost station on this line, which links two of Newark's three train stations. To the south of Center Street is Newark Penn Station and to the north is Broad Street Station with stops at Atlantic Street and Riverfront Stadium on game days.  Riding southbound the train leaves Broad Street and stops at Washington Park, NJPAC/Center Street, and Penn Station. Service on this line opened on July 17, 2006, at 1:00 p.m. EDT.

References

External links

 Station from Center Street from Google Maps Street View

Newark Light Rail stations
Railway stations in the United States opened in 2006
2006 establishments in New Jersey